is an interchange passenger railway station located in the city of  Kaizuka, Osaka Prefecture, Japan. The station is operated by two private railways, Nankai Electric Railway and the Mizuma Railway. It has station number "NK26" in the Nankai Electric Railway system.

Lines

Layout
The station consists of two island platforms connected by an elevated station building for the Nankai Main Line and one ground level bay platform serving the Mizuma Line.

Platforms

Adjacent stations

History
Kaizuka Station opened on 1 October 1897 on the Nankai Railway. The Mizuma Railway began operations on 25 April 1933.

Passenger statistics
In fiscal 2019, the Nankai Electric portion the station was used by an average of 20,079 passengers daily. During the same period, then Mizuma Railway portion of the station was used by 4,523 passengers daily.

Surrounding area
 Gansen-
Kaizuka Post Office

See also
 List of railway stations in Japan

References

External links

  

Railway stations in Japan opened in 1897
Railway stations in Osaka Prefecture
Kaizuka, Osaka